The following is a list of events affecting Canadian television in 2023. Events listed include television show debuts, finales, cancellations, and channel launches, closures and rebrandings.

Events

February

March

Programs

Programs debuting in 2023

Programs ending in 2023

Specials

Networks and services

Network conversions and rebrandings

Closures

Deaths

See also
List of Canadian films of 2023

References